Groovin the Moo is an annual music festival that is held in six regional centres across Australia. The festival is held during autumn, typically in May of each year.

Groovin the Moo was established by Cattleyard Promotions and their first festival was held on Sunday 24 April 2005 in Gloucester, New South Wales. The festivals were held each year until 2019, but in 2020 and 2021 there were no festivals because of the COVID-19 pandemic.

History
The first incarnation of the festival occurred on 24 April 2005 at the Gloucester Showgrounds in New South Wales with crowds of over 1400, continuing to Narrandera (NSW Riverina) with crowds exceeding 1800. The following year the festival took place in Maitland, Albury and Darwin.

2007 was a break-through year for the festival, with headlining Australian act Silverchair and successful international act The Black Keys headlining, along with the largely popular Hilltop Hoods, John Butler Trio and You Am I. In 2008 Townsville was added to the tour's circuit, with Bendigo being added the following year.

2010 saw the inclusion of Bunbury and Canberra, with all shows selling out across the country.

In 2014, an Oakbank show was added to the tour and went on to sell out.

Australia's first pill testing trial was held at the 2018 festival in Canberra.

In 2020, and 2021, festivals were not held because of restrictions resulting from the COVID-19 pandemic in Australia. Tickets purchased for 2020 will be valid for the event in 2022.

Festivals venues

Lineups year by year
As listed on the official website. Bold indicates headline act. All acts are Australian unless stated otherwise.

2005

Notes
 The Narrandera show was also known by some sources as "Groovin the Moo 2". While www.GTM.net.au still references the Narrandera show as taking place under the "ABOUT GTM" section, it is not referenced under the "PAST LINEUPS" section bringing into question the official status of this show today.

2006

Notes
 "Gomez", from the United Kingdom, is credited as the first international act to appear at Groovin The Moo on www.GTM.net.au. However "Local Knowledge", from New Zealand, played twice before "Gomez" first appearance, once in 2005 & once in 2006.

2007

Notes
A  Maitland Showground 12 May. 
B  Albury Racecourse 24 November.

2008

Notes
A  Maitland Showground 26 April. 
B  Lou Lister Park 3 May.

2009
 The Living End
 Hilltop Hoods
 The Grates
 De La Soul (USA)
 Architecture in Helsinki
 Little Birdy
 Muscles (DJ Set)
 Infusion
 Okkervil River (USA)
 Ratatat (USA)
 The Drones
 Van She
 Tame Impala
 Miami Horror (Live)
 The Twelves (Brazil)
 Horrorshow
 Christer (CAN)
 Hercules in NY
 My Own Enemy - Pushover Winner

 2 May 2009 – Lou Litster Park, Townsville.
 9 May 2009 – Maitland Showground, Maitland.
 16 May 2009 – Prince of Wales Showground's, Bendigo.

2010
 Vampire Weekend (USA)
 Silverchair
 Empire of the Sun
 Grinspoon
 Tegan and Sara (CAN)
 Spoon (USA)
 British India
 Lisa Mitchell
 Miami Horror
 Kisschasy
 Bag Raiders
 Kid Koala presents The Slew Live (CAN)
 Muph and Plutonic
 Funkoars
 Space Invadas Illy
 Ajax
 Jonathan Boulet
 Yacht Club DJs
 Killaqueens
 The Only

 Saturday 1 May, Bendigo, Prince of Wales Showground. 
 Sunday 2 May, Townsville, Murray Sporting Complex – Townsville Cricket Grounds.
 Saturday 8 May, Maitland, Maitland Showground. 
 Sunday 9 May, Canberra, The Meadows, University of Canberra.
 Saturday 15 May, Bunbury, Hay Park.

2011
 AC Slater (USA)
 Art vs. Science
 Architecture in Helsinki
 The Aston Shuffle
 Birds of Tokyo
 Bliss n Eso
 Cut Copy
 Darwin Deez (USA)
 Datarock (NOR)
 Drapht
 The Drums (USA)
 The Go! Team (UK)
 Gotye
 Gyroscope
 The Holidays
 Horrorshow
 House of Pain (USA)
 The Jezabels
 Nina Las Vegas (Triple J)
 Sampology (AV/DJ Set)
 Unkle-Live (UK)
 Washington
 The Wombats (UK)
 The Wombats and The Holidays pulled out of the Bunbury show due to overseas commitments. They were replaced by Boy & Bear along with 360 and Pez.

 Sat 30 April, Prince of Wales Showground, Bendigo.
 Sun 1 May, Townsville Cricket Grounds, Townsville.
 Sat 7 May, Maitland Showground, Maitland.
 Sun 8 May, The Meadows, University of Canberra.
 Sat 14 May, Hay Park, Bunbury.

2012
 360
 Adrian Lux (SWE)
 Andrew WK (USA) One Man Party Tour
 Ball Park Music
 Beni
 Big Scary
 Bluejuice
 Chiddy Bang (USA)
 City and Colour (CAN)
 Digitalism (GER)
 The Getaway Plan
 Gold Fields
 Hermitude
 Hilltop Hoods
 Kaiser Chiefs (UK)
 Kimbra (NZ)
 The Maccabees (UK)
 Matt Corby
 Muscles
 Mutemath (USA)
 Naysayer & Gilsun
 Parkway Drive
 Public Enemy (USA)
 Purple Sneakers DJs
 San Cisco
 Wavves (USA)
 Ball Park Music replaced Chiddy Bang, who withdrew from the lineup so they could focus on promoting their (at the time) upcoming album.

 Sat 5 May, Prince of Wales Showground, Bendigo. 
 Sun 6 May, Murray Sporting Complex, Townsville. 
 Sat 12 May, Maitland Showground, Maitland. 
 Sun 13 May, The Meadows, Canberra. 
 Sat 19 May, Hay Park, Bunbury.

2013
 Allday (Bunbury only)
 Alison Wonderland
 Alpine
 The Amity Affliction
 The Bronx (USA)
 DZ Deathrays (DJ Set)
 Example (UK)
 Flume
 Frightened Rabbit (UK)
 Hungry Kids of Hungary
 The Kooks (UK)
 Last Dinosaurs
 Matt & Kim (USA)
 Midnight Juggernauts
 Pez
 Regurgitator
 Seth Sentry
 ShockOne
 Tame Impala
 Tegan and Sara (CAN)
 The Temper Trap
 They Might Be Giants (USA)
 Tuka With Ellesquire
 Urthboy
 DJ Woody's Big Phat 90's Mixtape (UK)
 Yacht (USA)
 Yolanda Be Cool
 During Pez's performance at the Bunbury show, 360 came on stage and performed "The Festival Song"
 Urthboy pulled out of the Bunbury show due to illness and was replaced with Allday

 Sat 27 Apr, Maitland Showground, Maitland. 
 Sun 28 Apr, University of Canberra, Canberra.
 Sat 4 May, Prince of Wales Showground, Bendigo. 
 Sun 5 May, Murray Sporting Complex, Townsville.
 Sat 11 May, Hay Park, Bunbury.

2014
 Action Bronson (USA)
 Andy Bull
 Allday
 Architecture in Helsinki
 Cults (USA)
 Disclosure (UK)
 Dizzee Rascal (UK)
 Holy F**K (CAN)
 Illy
 The Jezabels
 The Jungle Giants
 Karnivool
 Kingswood
 The Kite String Tangle
 Loon Lake
 The Naked and Famous (NZ)
 Parkway Drive
 Peking Duk
 The Presets
 Robert Delong (USA)
 Thundamentals
 Vance Joy
 Violent Soho
 Wave Racer
 What So Not
 Action Bronson cancelled his appearance at GTM 2014 due to ""unforeseen circumstances regarding recording commitments" and was replaced by Allday 

 Friday, 25 April, Oakbank Racecourse, Oakbank. 
 Saturday, 26 April, Maitland Showground, Maitland.
 Sunday, 27 April, University of Canberra.
 Saturday, 3 May, Prince of Wales Showground, Bendigo. 
 Sunday, 4 May, Murray Sporting Complex, Townsville.
 Saturday, 10 May, Hay Park, Bunbury.

2015
 ASAP Ferg (USA)
 Ball Park Music
 Broods (NZ)
 Carmada
 Charli XCX (UK)
 The Delta Riggs
 DMA'S
 Flight Facilities
 Hermitude
 Hilltop Hoods
 Hot Dub Time Machine
 Meg Mac
 Northlane
 One Day
 Peace (UK)
 Peaches (CAN)
 The Preatures
 RL Grime (USA)
 San Cisco 
 Saskwatch 
 Sticky Fingers
 Tkay Maidza
 Wolfmother
 You Me at Six (UK)

 Saturday 25 April, Oakbank Racecourse, Oakbank.
 Sunday 26 April, Hay Park, Bunbury.
 Saturday 2 May, Prince of Wales Showground, Bendigo. 
 Sunday 3 May, University of Canberra, Canberra.
 Saturday 9 May, Maitland Showground, Maitland. 
 Sunday 10 May, Murray Sports Complex, Townsville.

2016
 Alison Wonderland
 Boo Seeka
 Boy & Bear
 British India
 Client Liaison
 Danny Brown (USA)
 Drapht
 DZ Deathrays
 Emma Louise
 Golden Features
 Harts
 In Hearts Wake
Illy
 Jarryd James
 MS MR (USA)
 Mutemath (USA) 
 Ngaiire
 Odesza (USA)
 Of Monsters and Men (ISL) (Bunbury only)
 Ratatat (USA)
 REMI
 The Rubens
 Safia
 Twenty One Pilots (USA)
 Vallis Alps
 Vic Mensa (USA) 
 What So Not
 Mutemath and Vic Mensa cancelled their appearances at GTM 2016 for unspecified reasons and were replaced by Jarryd James and What So Not
 Of Monsters and Men were added to the lineup, but only for the Bunbury show

 Saturday, 23 April, Maitland Showground, Maitland. 
 Sunday, 24 April, University of Canberra, Canberra. 
 Monday, 25 April, Oakbank Racecourse, Oakbank.
 Saturday, 30 April, Bendigo's Prince of Wales Showground, Bendigo. 
 Sunday, 1 May, Townsville Cricket Grounds, Townsville.
 Saturday, 7 May, Hay Park, Bunbury.

2017
 Against Me! (USA)
 Allday
 Amy Shark
 Architects (UK)
 The Darkness (UK)
 Dillon Francis (USA)
 DRAM (USA)
 George Maple
 Hayden James
 The Jungle Giants
 K.Flay (USA)
 L-FRESH the Lion
 Loyle Carner (UK)
 Methyl Ethel
 Milky Chance (GER)
 Montaigne
 Northeast Party House
 Pnau
 Slumberjack
 The Smith Street Band
 Snakehips (UK)
 Tash Sultana
 Thundamentals
 Violent Soho
 The Wombats (UK)
 DRAM was originally announced to play GTM 2017, however he cancelled his appearance before the full lineup was announced for unknown reasons.
 Tash Sultana cancelled her sets at the Maitland and Bendigo shows due to illness. She was replaced by Amy Shark in Bendigo.
 Montaigne cancelled her set the Bendigo show due to illness. It is unknown who her replacement was.

 Friday 28 April, Adelaide Showground, Wayville (SA). 
 Saturday 29 April, Maitland Showground, Maitland (NSW). 
 Sunday 30 April, Murray Sports Complex, Townsville (QLD). 
 Saturday 6 May, Bendigo's Prince of Wales Showground, Bendigo (VIC).  
 Sunday 7 May, University of Canberra, Bruce (ACT). 
 Saturday 13 May, Hay Park, Bunbury (WA).

2018
 Alex Lahey
 Aminé (USA)
 The Amity Affliction
 Baker Boy
 Ball Park Music
 Claptone (GER)
 Confidence Man
 Cosmo's Midnight
 Dean Lewis
 Duckwrth (USA) (Bunbury only)
 Duke Dumont (UK)
 Flight Facilities
 Grinspoon
 Lady Leshurr (UK)
 Mallrat
 N.W.A.'s DJ Yella ft. Playboy T (USA)
 Ocean Alley
 Paul Kelly
 Portugal. The Man (USA)
 Public Service Broadcasting (UK)
 Royal Blood (UK)
 Sampa the Great
 Skegss
 SuperDuperKyle (USA)
 Tkay Maidza
 Vera Blue
 Winston Surfshirt 
 SuperDuperKyle cancelled his appearance at GTM 2018 due to changes in his album scheduling and was replaced by DJ Yella ft. Playboy T  
 Duckwrth was added to the lineup, but only for the Bunbury show

 Friday 27 April, Adelaide Showground, Wayville (SA) 
 Saturday 28 April, Maitland Showground, Maitland (NSW) 
 Sunday 29 April, University of Canberra, Bruce (ACT) 
 Saturday 5 May, Bendigo's Prince of Wales Showground, Bendigo (VIC) 
 Sunday 6 May, Murray Sports Complex, Townsville (QLD) 
 Saturday 12 May, Hay Park, Bunbury (WA)

2019
 ASAP Twelvyy (USA)
 Angie McMahon
 Aurora (NOR)
 Billie Eilish (USA)
 Carmouflage Rose 
 Coolio (USA)
 Crooked Colours
 DMA's
 Duckwrth (USA)
 Fisher
 Flosstradamus (USA)
 G Flip
 Haiku Hands
 Hermitude
 Hilltop Hoods
 Holy Holy
 Jack River
 Jimothy (UK)
 Just A Gent
 MØ (DNK)
 Nick Murphy
 Nicole Millar
 Regurgitator
 Rejjie Snow (IRL)
 ShockOne (Bunbury only)
 Sofi Tukker (USA)
 Spinderella (USA)
 Thelma Plum
 Tokimonsta (USA)
 Trophy Eyes
 Wafia
 Tokimonsta cancelled her appearance at GTM 2019 for unspecified reasons and was replaced by Wafia and Jimothy.
 Fisher did not appear in Bunbury and was replaced with ShockOne.

 Friday 26 April, Adelaide Showground, Wayville (SA)
 Saturday 27 April, Maitland Showground, Maitland (NSW)
 Sunday 28 April, Exhibition Park, Canberra (ACT)
 Saturday 4 May, Bendigo's Prince of Wales Showground, Bendigo (VIC)
 Sunday 5 May, Murray Sports Complex, Townsville (QLD)
 Saturday 11 May, Hay Park, Bunbury (WA)

2020
The 2020 festival was cancelled due to a ban on gatherings of more than 500 people as well as international borders being closed to non-citizens in relation to the COVID-19 pandemic in Australia

AJ Tracey (UK)
Bhad Bhabie (USA)
Blanco Brown (USA)
The Cat Empire
Channel Tres (USA)
Clairo (USA)
Darude (FIN)
Dope Lemon
E^ST
Gang of Youths
Hayden James
Kelis (USA)
Kira Puru
Mallrat
Manu Crooks
Maxo Kream (USA)
Ruby Fields
San Cisco
Slowly Slowly
Sugarhill Gang (USA)
Supergrass (UK)
Tones and I
The Veronicas
Waax
YBN Cordae (USA)

Friday 24 April, Adelaide Showground, Wayville (SA)
Saturday 25 April, Exhibition Park, Canberra (ACT)
Sunday 26 April, Hay Park, Bunbury (WA)
Saturday 2 May, Bendigo's Prince of Wales Showground, Bendigo (VIC)
Sunday 3 May, Murray Sports Complex, Townsville (QLD)
Saturday 9 May, Maitland Showground, Maitland (NSW)

2022
The festival returned in 2022 after the 2020 and 2021 festivals were cancelled, however the Townsville, Bunbury, and Wayville legs were scrapped due to uncertainty regarding crowd capacity and national/international travel restrictions related to the COVID-19 pandemic in Australia

Alice Ivy
Broods (NZ)
CHAII (NZ)
grentperez
Hilltop Hoods
Hockey Dad
Hope D
HP Boyz
Jesswar
JK-47
Lime Cordiale
Mashd N Kutcher
Masked Wolf
Middle Kids
Milky Chance (GER)
Montaigne
Peking Duk
Polaris
RedHook
Riton (UK)
Shouse
Snakehips (UK)
Spiderbait
Sycco
Thomas Headon (UK)
Wolf Alice (UK)
 Milky Chance cancelled their appearance at GTM 2022 due to travel issues related to the COVID-19 pandemic in Europe and were replaced by Lime Cordiale  
 HP Boyz cancelled their appearance at GTM 2022 for unspecified reasons and were replaced by grentperez
 Illy joined Mashd N Kutcher onstage during the Bendigo leg

Saturday 23 April, Maitland Showground, Maitland (NSW)
Sunday 24 April, Exhibition Park, Canberra (ACT)
Saturday 30 April, Bendigo's Prince Of Wales Showground, Bendigo (VIC)

2023
The 2023 festival returned to its full 6 day touring schedule, however the Townsville leg was dropped due to "logistical and financial difficulties" related to the COVID-19 pandemic in Australia and a Sunshine Coast leg was added as a replacement

Alt-J (UK) 
Amy Shark
Ball Park Music
Barkaa
bbno$ (CAN)
The Chats
Choomba
Confidence Man
Denzel Curry (USA)
Eliza Rose (UK)
Fatboy Slim (UK)
Genesis Owusu
Laurel (UK)
Luude
Nothing But Thieves (UK)
Ocean Alley
Omar Apollo (USA)
Royel Otis
Skegss
Skepta (UK)
Slayyyter (USA)
Slowly Slowly
Sophie May (UK)
Teen Jesus and the Jean Teasers
Teenage Dads
Teenage Joans
 Omar Apollo and Skepta cancelled their appearances at GTM 2023 for unspecified reasons and were replaced by Nothing But Thieves and Genesis Owusu

 Friday 21 April, Adelaide Showground, Wayville (SA)
 Saturday 22 April, Maitland Showground, Maitland (NSW)
 Sunday 23 April, Exhibition Park, Canberra (ACT)
 Saturday 29 April, Prince of Wales Showground, Bendigo (VIC)
 Sunday 30 April, Kawana Sports Western Precinct, Sunshine Coast (QLD)
 Saturday 6 May, Hay Park, Bunbury (WA)

THE PLOT

Established in 2013 by parent company Cattleyard Promotions, THE PLOT is a sister music festival to Groovin the Moo which focuses more on emerging and breaking Australian musicians. Launched on 16 September and to date all of events have been held in metropolitan cities, unlike "Groovin the Moo" which is held in various regional centres across Australia.

2013
Bold indicates headline act.

Notes
A  Big Top Luna Park 14 December.
B  Palace Theater and Ding Dong Lounge 15 December. 
The full lineup was announced on 9 October.

2014
The Plot was not held in 2014.

2015
Bold indicates headline act.

Notes
A  Parramatta Park 5 December.

The full lineup was announced on 30 September.

2016
A  Parramatta Park 19 December.

The full lineup was announced on 24 August.

A.B. Original, Alex Lahey, Allday, Amy Shark, Confidence Man, GL, Hellions, Soul Benefits, Kinder, Ebony Boadu, Sarah Connor, Amber Dubs, The Belligerents, The Bennies, Bootleg Rascal, Buoy, Cult Shotta, Dorsal Fins, Dylan Joel, E^ST, Elizabeth Rose, FROYO, Gold Fields, Hyjak, Indian Summer, Ivan Ooze (rapper), Jannath Beth + DJ Lili Joy, Japanese Wallpaper, Kazi A, Lanks, Luca Brasi, Mallrat, MMAD, Montaigne, Mumbles, Nardine, Nicole Millar, Ocean Alley, Onion Man, Paces, Pierce Brothers, Richard Bell, Running Touch, Tash Sultana, Thelma Plum, Tired Lion, Vera Blue, WSU Poets, Zeadala + Judenn, Ziggy Alberts.

2017
A  Parramatta Park 18 December.

The full lineup was announced on 23 August.

Airling, Alex The Astronaut, Alice Ivy, Bec Sandridge, Cable Ties, Clowns, Confidence Man, Dean Lewis, Dear Seattle, Dobby, Haiku Hands, Hatchie, Hollow Coves, Jess Locke, Kuren, Kyle Lionhart, Lastlings, Maddy Jane, Mallrat, Manu Crook$, Miss Blanks, Ninajirachi, Northeast Party House, Nyxen, Odette, Oh Boy, Okenyo, Ruby Fields, Saatsuma, Skeggs, Sleepmakeswaves, Stella Donnelly, The Teskey Brothers, Tigertown, Waax, YoungstaCPT (RSA).

Awards and nominations

National Live Music Awards
The National Live Music Awards (NLMAs) are a broad recognition of Australia's diverse live industry, celebrating the success of the Australian live scene. The awards commenced in 2016.

|-
| National Live Music Awards of 2016
| Groovin the Moo
| ACT Live Event of the Year
| 
|-
| rowspan="2" |  National Live Music Awards of 2019
| rowspan="2"| Groovin the Moo
| Best Live Music Festival or Event
| 
|-
| ACT Live Event of the Year
| 
|-

References

8. http://www.gtm.net.au/gtms-south-australian-show-moves-venues/

External links
 Groovin the Moo official website

Concert tours
Rock festivals in Australia
Music festivals established in 2005